Eupithecia ecplyta is a moth in the  family Geometridae. It is found in Kenya.

References

Moths described in 1932
ecplyta
Moths of Africa